A constitutional referendum was held in Romania on 8 December 1991. The new constitution was approved by 79.1% of voters.

Results

References

Romanian Revolution
Romania
1991 in Romania
Constitutional referendums in Romania
December 1991 events in Romania